They Shoot Horses, Don't They? may refer to:

They Shoot Horses, Don't They? (novel), a novel by Horace McCoy
They Shoot Horses, Don't They? (film), a 1969 film adapted from the novel
They Shoot Horses, Don't They? (band), a Canadian rock band
"They Shoot Horses, Don't They?", a song by Racing Cars
"They Shoot Horse, Don't They?", a song by Quickspace from the 2000 album The Death of Quickspace